The orangefin barb (Enteromius eutaenia) is a species of cyprinid fish in the genus Enteromius. This species may actually be a species complex, it is widely distributed in southern and central Africa. It is caught as food and kept as an ornamental fish in hobby aquariums. It grows to 14 cm SL, but is generally around 9 cm.

It favours clear-flowing waters, usually headwater streams with rocky habitats, although it is known from sandy streams in the Caprivi Strip. This fish will ascend tributaries during the dry season, and move only onto floodplains in rainy season. It feeds on insects.

Footnotes 

Enteromius
Cyprinid fish of Africa
Taxa named by George Albert Boulenger
Fish described in 1904